Thorness Bay is an  Site of special scientific interest which is located on the north-west coast of the Isle of Wight, England, in the western arm of the Solent. The site was notified in 1966 for both its biological and geological features.
The bay stretches about 3 km from Salt Mead Ledge in the west to Gurnard Head Nr. Gurnard Bay to the east.

The sea bed is a mixture of mud and sand.

A small unnamed brook enters the sea in the middle of the bay after passing through a marsh.

Little Thorness Farm, a beef farm near the bay has  of protected marshland under stewardship and is a SSSI because it is home to wildlife not found in other areas.

Holiday Park
Thorness Bay also has a holiday park run by Parkdean Resorts. It has a direct footpath leading straight to the beach.

References
Natural England citation sheet

Bays of the Isle of Wight
Sites of Special Scientific Interest on the Isle of Wight